The Horizon Learning Channel had educational material for the whole family, with documentaries, shows for pre-school children, cooking courses for the grown-ups, language study, and a range of other home education programmes.

It also featured specialist children's programming from Australia and overseas. Working closely with the Education Department and curriculum advisers in each state, it also helped create special programming to help students with their courses.

External links
 Optus Vision – Horizon Learning Channel Promo (1996)

Defunct television channels in Australia
Television channels and stations established in 1996
Television channels and stations disestablished in 1999
English-language television stations in Australia